is a small, sweet glazed biscuit that shares many similarities with a gingerbread cookie. The name of the dish directly translates to "stomach-bread" as it is believed to help improve digestion. This recipe first appeared in Swiss cooking books in the late 18 century. It is usually sold in Christmas markets in northern Switzerland and southern Germany.

Appearance and composition
Magenbrot is known for its diamond shape and dark brown exterior  in Germany, and its bread slice shape in Switzerland. This pastry is made with flour, wheat, baking soda, star anise, cinnamon, cloves, and nutmeg and sweetened using honey and sugar. Candied orange, lemon peel, and hazelnut are also added for flavoring. Some types of Magenbrot are coated with a sweet Cocoa glaze.

It is usually prepared over a period of two days. The dough is made beforehand and left for an entire night so it can settle properly. It is then separated into small pieces and baked in an oven.

 was also previously called  (Alpine herbs bread).

See also
Swiss cuisine
German cuisine

References 

Swiss cuisine
German cuisine
Christmas food
German words and phrases